HMS Deptford was a 60-gun fourth rate ship of the line of the Royal Navy, built to the dimensions of the 1719 Establishment at Deptford Dockyard, and launched on 22 August 1732.

In 1752, she was cut down to a 50-gun ship.

On 31 January 1759  and Deptford chased a French privateer that Montagu captured the next day. The privateer was Marquis de Martigny, of Granville. She had a crew of 104 men under the command of M. Le Crouse, and was armed with twenty 6-pounder guns.

In 1761 Deptford sailed to Jamaica carrying a timekeeper built by John Harrison, as a part of a series of experiments to determine longitude at sea.

Fate
Deptford was sold out of the navy in 1767.

Citations and references
Citations

References

Lavery, Brian (2003) The Ship of the Line - Volume 1: The development of the battlefleet 1650-1850. Conway Maritime Press. .

Ships of the line of the Royal Navy
1730s ships